The Loyalist Volunteer Force (LVF) is a small Ulster loyalist paramilitary group in Northern Ireland. It was formed by Billy Wright in 1996 when he and his unit split from the Ulster Volunteer Force (UVF) after breaking its ceasefire. Most of its members came from the UVF's Mid-Ulster Brigade, which Wright had commanded. In a two-year period from August 1996, the LVF waged a paramilitary campaign in opposition to Irish republicanism and the Northern Ireland peace process. During this time it killed at least 14 people in gun and bomb attacks, almost all of them Catholic civilians killed at random. The LVF called off its campaign in August 1998 and decommissioned some of its weapons, but in the early 2000s a loyalist feud led to several killings. Since then, the LVF has been largely inactive, but its members are believed to have been involved in rioting and organized crime. In 2015, the security forces stated that the LVF "exists only as a criminal group" in Mid-Ulster and Antrim.

The LVF is designated a terrorist group by the United Kingdom and United States.

Goals
In a document, the LVF outlined its goals as follows:
The use of the Ulster conflict as a crucible for far-reaching, fundamental and decisive change in the United Kingdom constitution. 
To restore Ulster's right to self-determination. 
To end Irish nationalist aggression against Ulster in whatever form.
To end all forms of Irish interference in Ulster's internal affairs.
To thwart the creation and/or implementation of any All-Ireland/All-Island political super-structure regardless of the powers vested in such institutions.
To defeat the campaign of de-Britishisation and Gaelicisation of Ulster's daily life.

There is also a Christian fundamentalist element within the LVF. Its leader, Billy Wright, was a born again Christian and former preacher. Professor Peter Shirlow, of Queen's University Belfast, noted that many LVF members saw Irish nationalism/republicanism and Catholicism as interlinked. They believed that Ulster Protestants were a persecuted people and Ulster was their "God-given land" which must be defended from these "dark and satanic forces".

The LVF published a magazine called Leading the Way.

History

Early days
Billy Wright was the leader of the Mid-Ulster Brigade of the Ulster Volunteer Force (UVF), having taken over the command from Robin "the Jackal" Jackson in the early 1990s upon the latter's retirement. In October 1994, the UVF and other loyalist paramilitary groups called a ceasefire. Internal differences between Wright and the UVF's Brigade Staff in Belfast came to a head in July 1996, during the Drumcree parade dispute. The Orange Order was being stopped from marching through the Catholic Garvaghy area of Portadown. There was a standoff at Drumcree Church between thousands of Orangemen and their supporters on one side, and the security forces on the other. Wright was angered that the march was being blocked, and was often seen at Drumcree with Harold Gracey, head of the Portadown Orange Lodge.

Wright's brigade smuggled homemade weaponry to Drumcree, apparently unhindered by the Orangemen. On 7 July, a day into the standoff, members of Wright's brigade shot dead Catholic taxi driver Michael McGoldrick near Aghagallon. The man who killed McGoldrick said he had also planned, along with Billy Wright and Mark Fulton, to kidnap three priests from a parochial house in County Armagh and shoot them unless the march was allowed to continue. Allegedly, the brigade also planned to drive petrol tankers into the Catholic area and blow them up. After four days of loyalist protests and violence throughout Northern Ireland, the police reversed their decision and allowed the march to continue.

For breaking the ceasefire, Wright and the Portadown unit of the Mid-Ulster Brigade were "stood down" by the UVF leadership on 2 August 1996. Wright and his unit left the UVF and formed the LVF. He personally chose its codename of "Covenant", which was used to claim LVF attacks.
   
Although behind many attacks in the Mid-Ulster area, especially in Portadown and Lurgan, Wright was finally arrested in January 1997 for issuing death threats and perverting the course of justice. He was convicted in March 1997 and sentenced to eight years in the Maze Prison. There he demanded a separate wing for LVF prisoners. The authorities agreed and the wing became a gathering point for loyalists opposed to the Northern Ireland peace process, including many from Belfast and north Down.

Death of Billy Wright
On 27 December 1997, Wright was assassinated by Irish National Liberation Army (INLA) prisoners inside the Maze Prison: Christopher "Crip" McWilliams, John Glennon and John Kennaway. The three were imprisoned in the same block as Wright. He was shot as he travelled in a prison van, and after killing Wright, the three handed themselves over to prison guards. They also handed over a statement: "Billy Wright was executed [...] for directing and waging his campaign of terror against the nationalist people from his prison cell".

That night, LVF gunmen opened fire on the dance hall of the Glengannon Hotel, near Dungannon. The hotel was owned by Catholics and about 400 teenagers were attending a disco there. Three civilians were wounded and one, a former Provisional IRA volunteer, was killed. Police believed that the disco itself was the intended target, rather than the ex-volunteer. Witnesses said it was "an attempt at mass-murder".

Some believed that prison authorities colluded with the INLA in Wright's killing. The INLA strongly denied these rumours, and published a detailed account of the assassination in the March/April 1999 issue of The Starry Plough newspaper.

Good Friday Agreement and ceasefire
In March 1998, during the negotiations for the Good Friday Agreement, the LVF issued a statement backing the anti-agreement Democratic Unionist Party (DUP), saying the party's leader, Ian Paisley, had got it "absolutely right". DUP Member of Parliament Willie McCrea appeared on public platforms with LVF leaders, including Billy Wright.

In May 1998 the LVF called a ceasefire and urged people to vote No in the referendum on the Agreement. The Northern Ireland Office accepted its ceasefire in November, making LVF prisoners eligible for early release under the Agreement. Later, it handed over a small amount of weapons to the Independent International Commission on Decommissioning. The decommissioned weapons were as follows:
4 sub-machine guns
2 rifles
2 pistols
1 sawn-off shotgun
2 pipe bombs
various ammunition and detonators

The destruction of some of the LVF arms were recorded by video. However, since the weapons were decommissioned in mid-1998 the LVF has killed four people.

Post-ceasefire activities
In early 2000, an LVF-UVF feud began and there were several tit-for-tat killings. This led the Secretary of State to declare on 12 October 2001 that the government no longer recognised their ceasefire.

After its ceasefire, the LVF continued supporting the Orangemen in their protest at Drumcree. In July 2000, it was revealed that members of neo-Nazi group Combat 18 were travelling from England to join the protest. They were given shelter by LVF volunteers in Portadown and Tandragee. Combat 18 had opposed the LVF's ceasefire, but this trip was said to mark a "healing of the rift".

In 2002, Wright's successor as LVF leader, Mark Fulton, was found hanged in Maghaberry prison. It is believed he committed suicide.

In July 2005 the IRA declared it had ended its armed campaign and would disarm. In September 2005 weapons inspectors declared that the IRA had fully disarmed. In response, on 30 October that year, the LVF stated that it was standing down.

In February 2006, the Independent Monitoring Commission confirmed that the LVF-UVF feud was over but said that the LVF's involvement with organised crime and drug trafficking continued, describing it as a "deeply criminal organisation". The twentieth IMC report stated that the group was small and without political purpose. Most of its violence was "more criminal than paramilitary" in nature. LVF members who continued violent activity were said to do so "for personal gain" and only associated with the organisation at large when it was helpful to do so. The report added that simple aggressive police work could damage the group's continuance.

Timeline of attacks
According to the Conflict Archive on the Internet's Sutton Database, the LVF have killed 18 people, which included:
13 civilians (11 Catholics and 2 Protestants)
3 UVF members
1 former Provisional IRA member
1 of its own members

Two further killings of Catholics were claimed by the LVF, but the RUC believed that UDA members were responsible.

The following is a timeline of attacks and attempted attacks that have been claimed by, or blamed on, the LVF.

1996
 7 July: in Aghagallon, the LVF shot dead Catholic taxi driver Michael McGoldrick (31) in his car, which the gunmen then set on fire. This was believed to be related to the Drumcree conflict; at the time, the Orange Order was being stopped from marching through the Catholic area of Portadown. Members of the group smuggled home-made weaponry to the protests at Drumcree church, apparently unhindered by the Orangemen.

1997
 20 January: the LVF was believed to be behind a bomb that exploded under a van owned by a Catholic in Larne, County Antrim.
 8 March: the LVF carried out firebomb attacks on Northern Ireland Tourist Board (NITB) offices in Banbridge and Newcastle, County Down. The attacks were believed to be a response to the marketing of the whole of Ireland as a tourist destination by the NITB alongside Bord Fáilte (the tourist board of the Republic of Ireland).
1 April: Mountpottinger Baptist Tabernacle, a Protestant church in East Belfast, was damaged in an arson attack. Although DUP press officer Sammy Wilson blamed Catholics, on 20 April Progressive Unionist Party leader David Ervine asserted it was an LVF attempt to raise sectarian tension.
 27 April: Robert Hamill (25), a Catholic civilian, was kicked to death by a loyalist mob in Portadown town centre while walking home. Police parked nearby did not intervene. The six men charged with his murder were placed in the LVF wing of the Maze Prison at their own request.
 12 May: the LVF kidnapped Catholic civilian Seán Brown (61) after he left the Gaelic Athletic Association (GAA) club in Bellaghy, County Londonderry. He was beaten, shot dead and his body found the next day by a burnt-out car on Moneynick Road near Randalstown.
 14 May: the LVF was believed to be responsible for trying to kill a Catholic taxi driver in Milford, County Armagh. He escaped when the gun jammed.
 24 May: the LVF claimed responsibility for planting a bomb in Dundalk, County Louth, Republic of Ireland. The time bomb was planted in an alleyway on Clanbrassil Street, the town's main shopping street. However, it only partially exploded and was then defused by Gardaí (the Republic's police). The LVF warned that further "no-warning bomb attacks" would take place "as long as Dublin interferes in Ulster affairs".
 2 July: the LVF threatened to kill Catholic civilians if an upcoming Orange march was banned from the Garvaghy Road in Portadown.
 15 July: the LVF killed Catholic civilian Bernadette Martin (18) in Aghalee. She was shot four times in the head as she slept in her Protestant boyfriend's home.
 24 July: the LVF kidnapped Catholic civilian James Morgan (16) in Newcastle, County Down. He was tortured, beaten to death with a hammer, and his body was then doused in petrol and set alight. His burnt and mutilated body was found three days later in a waterlogged ditch used for the disposal of animal carcasses near Clough. Norman Coopey was charged and convicted of the killing.
 5 August: the LVF claimed responsibility for trying to kill a Catholic taxi driver in Lurgan. He escaped when the gun jammed.
 12 August: twenty-seven LVF prisoners in the Maze Prison began a riot which caused severe damage to C and D wings of H-Block 6.
 14 August: the LVF was blamed for attacks on the homes of four serving and former prison officers in Mid-Ulster.
 17 November: the LVF claimed responsibility for planting four small bombs in Dundalk, Republic of Ireland, which were removed by police.
 5 December: the LVF shot dead Catholic civilian Gerry Devlin (36) outside a GAA club in Glengormley, County Antrim.
 27 December: the LVF launched a gun attack on the dance hall of the Catholic-owned Glengannon Hotel near Dungannon, County Tyrone. Hundreds of teenagers were attending a disco inside when gunmen fired on a crowd of people at the entrance. A doorman, Catholic civilian Seamus Dillon (45), was killed and three other people were wounded. This was believed to be revenge for the killing of Billy Wright earlier that day. The LVF said: "This attack and future attacks lay squarely at the feet of republicans. For too long the Protestant people have watched their very faith, culture and identity being slowly eroded away".
 31 December: the LVF claimed responsibility for a gun attack on the Clifton Tavern on Cliftonville Road, Belfast. Gunmen burst into the pub and sprayed it with gunfire. Catholic civilian Eddie Treanor (31) was killed and five others were wounded. The RUC believed that UDA members were involved.

1998

10 January: the LVF launched a gun attack on the Space nightclub at Talbot Street, Belfast. Gunmen pulled up in a car and opened fire on people standing at the door. A doorman, Catholic civilian Terry Enright (28), was killed. He was a cross-community worker who helped steer young people away from violence. The LVF said it was revenge for the killing of Billy Wright.
18 January: the LVF killed Catholic civilian Fergal McCusker (28) in Maghera, County Londonderry. He was kidnapped and shot dead while walking home. His body was found behind a youth center off Tircane Road.
19 January: the LVF claimed responsibility for shooting dead Catholic taxi driver Larry Brennan (52) as he sat in his car on Ormeau Road, Belfast. The attack happened hours after the INLA killed UDA member Jim Guiney, and police believe UDA members were involved.
23 January: the LVF shot dead Catholic construction worker Liam Conway (39) as he operated a digger on Hesketh Road, Belfast.
24 January: the LVF shot dead Catholic taxi driver John McColgan (33) in Belfast. He had picked up a number of men on the Andersonstown Road, who told him to drive to Upper Glen Road. They then shot him and drove off in the taxi, leaving his body by the roadside.
25 January: the LVF claimed responsibility for shooting and wounding a Catholic civilian in Lurgan. The man was sitting in the cab of a lorry when a lone gunman shot at him several times.
27 January: the LVF was blamed for trying to kill a Catholic taxi driver in North Belfast. He escaped when the gun jammed.
27 January: the Northern Ireland Council for Voluntary Action (NICVA) announced that the LVF had issued death threats against a number of Catholic cross-community workers in the Mid-Ulster area.
4 February: the LVF admitted firing a shot at a Protestant man in Lurgan and warned him to leave the area.
23 February: the LVF claimed responsibility for planting a small car bomb outside a Garda station in Dromad, County Louth, Republic of Ireland. It was spotted and defused by the security forces. The LVF threatened further attacks in the Republic.
3 March: the LVF killed a Catholic and a Protestant civilian—Damian Trainor (26) and Philip Allen (34)—in the Railway Bar in Poyntzpass, County Armagh. Gunmen entered the Catholic-owned pub, told them to lie on the floor and then shot them dead. The two were close friends.
5 March: the LVF was blamed for a gun attack on a house in a mainly-Protestant area of Antrim. A Catholic man and his Protestant wife lived there. She and her daughter were wounded.
8 March: the LVF issued threats against Protestant churchmen, business leaders and politicians whom it claimed were "colluding" with the peace process.
17 March: the LVF claimed responsibility for an attempted bomb attack on St Comgall's parish centre in Larne. The building was packed with people celebrating Saint Patrick's Day when two men threw a bomb through the door. The bomb failed to explode and was defused.
21 April: the LVF killed Catholic civilian Adrian Lamph (29) in Portadown. A gunman cycled into his workplace—the Fairgreen amenity site on Duke Street—then singled him out and shot him. He was the first victim of the conflict since the signing of the Good Friday Agreement.
25 April: the LVF shot dead a Catholic civilian, Ciaran Heffron (22), as he walked home in Crumlin, County Antrim. Meanwhile, 25 civilians escaped injury when a bomb was thrown into a Catholic-owned pub and restaurant at Aghinlig, County Armagh.
15 May: the LVF announced an "unequivocal ceasefire" which it hoped would encourage people to vote against the Good Friday Agreement.
2 July: the LVF was blamed for setting fire to ten Catholic churches in Northern Ireland. Churches were burnt over a ten-hour period in Crumlin, Lisburn, Dromore, Castlewellan, Banbridge, Laurencetown, Tandragee and Dungannon. The attacks were believed to be a response to the banning of the Orange Order's Drumcree march. The LVF was also blamed for petrol bombing the homes of two Catholics in Derry.
15 July: a package addressed to a Dublin hotel, which was believed to have been sent by the LVF, exploded while it was being examined at the Garda Technical Bureau. Two were injured in the blast.
8 August: the LVF issued a statement saying that its "war is over".

1999 onward
26 March 1999: the LVF warned that there would be a great strain on its ceasefire if the Provisional IRA did not begin disarming.
5 June 1999: LVF members launched pipe bomb attacks on two houses in the Corcrain area of Portadown. One of them killed Protestant civilian Elizabeth O'Neill (59), who was married to a Catholic man.
10 January 2000: LVF members killed the UVF's Mid-Ulster commander, Richard Jameson (46). He was shot dead while sitting in his car outside his home on Derrylettiff Road near Portadown. He was also a member of the Orange Order. The killing was part of a loyalist feud.
26 May 2000: LVF members shot dead UVF member Martin Taylor (35) at his home on Silverstream Park, Belfast. This killing was part of a loyalist feud.
11 April 2001: LVF members shot dead UVF member Grahame Marks (37) at his home in Tandragee. He was also a member of the Orange Order. This killing was part of a loyalist feud.

Young Loyalist Volunteers

The youth division of the LVF was known as the Young Loyalist Volunteers (YLV). They were founded in 1997 and officially ended their activities in 2005.

See also

Orange Volunteers
Red Hand Defenders

References

Further reading
Eighth report of the Independent Monitoring Commission, 1 February 2006
Chris Anderson, "The Billy Boy - The Life and Death of LVF Leader Billy Wright"

 
Proscribed paramilitary organisations in Northern Ireland
Organizations based in Europe designated as terrorist
Organisations designated as terrorist by the United Kingdom
Organizations established in 1996
Organizations disestablished in 2005
Ulster loyalist militant groups